Mike Snoei (born 4 December 1963) is a former Dutch football player and manager. He is currently in charge of Eerste Divisie side Telstar. During his playing days, Snoei played for Excelsior and Sparta Rotterdam in the Eredivisie and Eerste Divisie from 1982 to 1993. He was a member of the Dutch squad at the 1983 FIFA World Youth Championship.

Playing career
Born in Rotterdam, Snoei managed to carve out a ten-year playing career in the Netherlands in the top-tier Eredivisie and second-tier Eerste Divisie. He started his footballing career as a youth with Feyenoord, the biggest club in Rotterdam, before moving to second division side S.B.V. Excelsior. He stayed with Excelsior for six years from 1982 to 1986 before joining Sparta Rotterdam. While with Sparta, Snoei played in the Dutch top tier Eredivisie.

Unfortunately, Snoei had to retire from the game in 1993 due to torn knee ligaments at the age of 29.

Coaching career

Youth coach: 1993–2002
Following retirement from professional football, Snoei became a youth coach in the Netherlands, coaching various clubs from 1993 to 1996. Then in 1996, Snoei joined the Vitesse youth organization where he eventually rose to head coach of the main youth team at the club.

Head coach at Dutch clubs: 2002–2008
In 2002, Snoei was appointed as the head coach of Vitesse in the Eredivisie. After coaching the club for one season, Snoei then moved to Sparta Rotterdam as head coach from 2003 to 2005 before moving to Go Ahead Eagles as the head coach in 2005 to 2008. While at Sparta and Go Ahead Eagles, Snoei led both clubs to the promotion play-offs for the Eredivisie.

Assistant coaching: 2008–2013
After leaving Go Ahead Eagles, Snoei left the Netherlands and became the assistant manager to Henk ten Cate at many clubs including Panathinakos from 2008 to 2010, Al Ahli of the UAE Arabian Gulf League in 2010, Umm Salal of the Qatar Stars League from 2010 to 2011, and then Shandong Luneng of the Chinese Super League from 2011 to 2012.

Pune and India: 2013–2017
On 8 May 2013, it was announced that Snoei would be returning to head coaching at Pune F.C. of the I-League in India. The Director of Football at Pune said that "Mike will be a great addition to Pune FC. He brings with him a wealth of experience from the top levels of both European and Asian football. As we continue to invest in our academy and youth teams, Mike will be the perfect fit to develop these players and help the club reach our long term goals". Snoei also became the fourth Dutch coach to be involved in Indian football after Wim Koevermans was signed as head coach of the national team, Rob Baan was brought in as the AIFF technical-director, and Eelco Schattorie was signed on as the head coach of fellow I-League club United.

Snoei's first signing at the club came on 7 June 2013 when the club signed up forward Prakash Thorat for the upcoming 2013–14 season. Snoei then led Pune in his first game as head coach on 21 September 2013 against Mohammedan at the Salt Lake Stadium. It was a successful debut for Snoei as his side won the match 3–1 thanks to a brace from new signing Raúl Fabiani and a goal from another new foreign signing James Meyer. He then coached Pune at home for the first time on 10 October 2013 against Mohun Bagan. Pune won the match 2–0 thanks to goals from academy product Thongkhosiem Haokip and James Meyer.

Back to the Netherlands: 2017–current
In 2017, Snoei moved back to the Netherlands as the new manager of Eerste Divisie club Telstar. He left Telstar in 2019 to accept an offer at De Graafschap, which he guided for two seasons.

On 11 June 2022, Telstar announced to have reappointed Snoei as their manager.

Approach and philosophy
After joining Pune F.C. Snoei said that the approach he wants to take the club in is one where youth development is key to the club's success. After his first press conference as head coach of the club Snoei said "Our main objective is to develop youngsters at the club. In this season, you will see good young players getting a fair chance in the first team. Striking the right balance is of utmost importance". He also said he would like to incorporate a Dutch style of play into the club.

Managerial statistics
.

References

External links
 Pune Football Club Profile.

1963 births
Living people
Footballers from Rotterdam
Feyenoord players
Excelsior Rotterdam players
Sparta Rotterdam players
Association football defenders
Eredivisie players
Eerste Divisie players
Dutch footballers
Netherlands youth international footballers
Dutch football managers
SBV Vitesse managers
Go Ahead Eagles managers
Pune FC managers
SC Telstar managers
I-League managers
Eredivisie managers
Eerste Divisie managers
Panathinaikos F.C. non-playing staff
Dutch expatriate sportspeople in Ukraine
Dutch expatriate football managers
Dutch expatriate sportspeople in India
Dutch expatriate sportspeople in Greece
Expatriate football managers in India